The Haven is the tidal river of the port of Boston, Lincolnshire in England. It provides access for shipping between Boston Deeps in The Wash and the town, particularly, the dock. It also serves as the outfall into the sea, of the River Witham and of several major land drains of the northern Fens of eastern England, which are known collectively as the Witham Navigable Drains..

Physical and economic development

The English settlers who arrived in The Wash, found tidal creeks which gave them entry to the habitable belt of land, inland from the salt-marshes. These creeks, they called "havens". There was a route inland from The Haven, with which this article deals, on which Boston later developed, to the upland of Lindsey. However, the port of Boston did not develop until after natural events had diverted the River Witham into The Haven during the eleventh century.

Simultaneously, this took the river away from Drayton, which had become the successor port of Swineshead as its estuary accumulated silt. The Swin had been to Swineshead what the Zwin was to Bruges but after the loss of the Witham, Bicker became more important than Drayton so its estuary became known as Bicker Haven.

At the time of the Domesday Book (1086), the accounting for Boston was still done under the heading of the manors of Drayton but the wealth of Drayton's holdings, as recorded in the Domesday Book, in Skirbeck makes the presence of a working port at Boston, which then lay in Skirbeck, near certain.

Before The Witham broke into it, The Haven's head was in the area which subsequently became the Market Place. The likely date for the switch of the Witham from Drayton to The Haven is 1014, the date recorded by the Anglo-Saxon Chronicle as one of unprecedented sea floods. There was another serious flood, later in the century but that came after 1086.

Subsequently, Boston and its Haven became busy with trade as wool was brought into the town for export, particularly to Flanders.

Modern port

Nowadays, the activity has moved below the old centre of the town. The fishing fleet moors below the railway bridge and trading vessels lie either in tidal berths beside the dock where there are facilities for handling scrap steel or in the dock itself where there are facilities for handling paper, steel coil and grain as well as timber and general cargo, including containers.

Boston Barrier
Historically, Boston has been affected by tidal flooding, caused by tidal surges passing up The Haven from the Wash. Flooding from this cause was particularly severe in 1953 and 1978. Following the creation of a new tidal lock in 2008 to allow boats to enter the South Forty-Foot Drain from the Haven, phase 1b of the project to create a navigable waterway between Boston and Spalding involved the construction of the Boston Barrier. As well as being part of wider flood defence works, this would allow boats to pass through Boston town centre to access the South Forty Foot Drain at most states of the tide. At the time, it was expected that work would be completed by 2013, but work did not start, and serious flooding occurred again in 2013, when over 800 homes and 79 businesses were inundated. Following a public enquiry in 2017, a £100 million project to build the barrier and associated flood defence works on both sides of the river, including widening the access to the Port of Boston wet dock, was awarded by the Environment Agency to the civil engineers BMMJV, a joint venture consisting of BAM Nuttall and Mott MacDonald.

The rising sector gate weighs 362 tonnes and is moved by two 55-tonne hydraulic rams. The scheme also included a control building for the barrier, higher flood defence walls along the river, including landscaping of the right bank, and the placing of matting on the bed of the river either side of the barrier, to prevent scouring undermining the structure. The construction of the barrier was innovative, as it is quite different to the Thames Barrier in its design, and the only other similar structure, that at Ipswich on the River Orwell, is some 30 percent smaller, and had not been commissioned at the time the Boston Barrier project began. Work began on the project in 2018, and the sector gate, which was manufactured in Holland, was delivered in November 2019. The gate was operational by December 2020, and the completed scheme offers better flood protection to over 13,000 homes and businesses.

Because the work affected navigation, it was authorised by a Transport and Works Act 1992 Order. The Transport and Works Act (1992) was introduced to simplify the process of obtaining permission for the construction or alteration of railways and inland navigations, and any work which interferes with rights of navigation. The completed barrier was recognised in the civil engineering world, receiving six awards, four from the Institution of Civil Engineers, one from the Royal Institute of Chartered Surveyors, and an Environment Agency Flood and Coast Award.

Historical connection
In 1607, The Haven, between Boston and the sea, was the scene of the first, abortive, attempt of the Scrooby Pilgrims, to leave England. Ultimately, in 1620, they became part of the original settlement of Plymouth, Massachusetts.

See also

Canals of the United Kingdom
History of the British canal system

References

Bibliography

External links

Ports and harbours of Lincolnshire
Boston, Lincolnshire
Rivers of Lincolnshire